Phthora nana (Medieval Greek ) is one of the ten modes of the Hagiopolitan Octoechos consisting of 8 diatonic echoi and two additional phthorai. It is used in different traditions of Orthodox chant until today (→ Neobyzantine Octoechos). The name "nana" is taken from the syllables (written in ligatures "ʅʅ") sung during the intonation which precedes a melody composed in this mode. The name "phthora" derived from the verb  and means "destroy" or "corrupt". It was usually referred to the diatonic genus of the eight mode system and as a sign used in Byzantine chant notation it indicated a "change to another genus", in the particular case of phthora nana a change to the enharmonic genus. Today the "nana" intonation has become the standard name of the third authentic mode which is called "echos tritos" in Greek and "third glas" in Old Church Slavonic.

The different functions of phthora nana 

In the theory and notation of Byzantine and Orthodox chant nana is the name of a special phthora which had been used in different ways according to its historic context:
as a phthora which has its proper melos (intonation and cadence formulas), it may denote a special kind of echos (mode) that has been identified with the echos tritos (third mode) since the 16th century, but deviates from the later diatonic echos tritos by the division of its tonal system and its tetrachord. The name "" (ʅʅ) was used for its proper enechema, and within the Hagiopolitan Octoechos whole troparia can be found in the tropologion or the chant book Octoechos which are composed in the melos of phthora nana.
as exoteric "phthora atzem", the sign was used for the transcription of music composed in makam acem, a makam connected to a certain Persian dastgah.
as a modulation sign, phthora nana played a crucial role to change between the third to the plagal fourth mode. Hence, there can be found some parallels between the b flat as used by Guido of Arezzo, and the temporary use of phthora nana in psaltic compositions which changed between the modes. As such phthora nana was used as an alteration sign within the heptaphonic solfeggio of Chrysanthos' New Method, which transcribed its triphonic tone system by a frequent use transposition (a certain  which turns  into  similar to the Guidonian mutation memorised as «F fa ut»).

Hagiopolites treatise about phthora nana 

It is supposed that the Hagiopolites treatise served during the 9th century as a manual preceding a chant book called tropologion. The book contained a collection of simple hymns troparia as well as heirmoi which served as melodic models for the 10 modes of Octoechos.

Nana holds the status one of the two "special" additional echoi or "mesoi" (medial forms between authentic and plagal echoi) in the system of the Hagiopolitan Octoechos. The other one is called nenano. Already in the Hagiopolites treatise the phthorai nana and nenano have been characterized as both echoi and "not echoi, but phthorai" (→ phthora). This means that they were proper modes with their own models, but they had to be integrated within the Octoechos and its eight-week cycle.

Phthora nana according to the theory and practice of psaltic art 

The concrete intervals of the enharmonic genus are less subject than the explanation of relationships between the modes. Often certain paragraphs of the Hagiopolites concerned about the phthora nana have been re-interpreted again and again according to the current tradition of psaltic art.

Its enechema 

According to theoretical explanations of the Papadike, phthora nana was not only defined by its melos like a proper echos itself, as such it had been subordinated to certain echoi already in the Hagiopolites treatise. Any other changes have to be made after the transition into the :

.

.

The distinction, that it was by the own solfège (apo parallagon) "like a kyrios echos of its own" (os echos kyrios), meant on the surface, that the tritos could be based on the octave on B flat (heptaphonia) with the finalis F, while it had to change into the  octave which was based on C and therefore used b natural as seventh degree. The triphonic solfège could be solved again from the enharmonic into the diatonic genus, but it was in fact not just a change of the genus (metavole kata genos), but also a change from the triphonic into the tetraphonic tone system (metavole kata systema). It was not organised by separated tetrachords (tetraphonia), but by connected ones (triphonia: C—F—b flat). Hence, the "own triphonic parallage" intermediated between both octave species, which were otherwise very far from each other. Already in this transitional function it formed an alternative melos of the  echoi.

Its tone system 
The phthora could intermediate, because it was distinct by its triphonic tone system and its enharmonic genus (the minor tone was always on the top of a tetrachord and smaller than a Western half tone—a diesis). Both possibilities were illustrated at the end of John Koukouzeles' didactic chant Mega Ison.

Its great sign and its dynamis as echos kratema 
The Papadikai list between six and ten phthorai which represent the ten modes of the Hagiopolitan Octoechos—the diatonic eight modes (which did not need eight phthorai, since the echoi just represented the four elements of a tetrachord) and the two additional phthorai as their own echoi.

In this very particular sense, the term "phthora" did neither refer to nenano nor nana, but simply meant the use of a transposition sign in order to indicate the precise place of a temporary transposition.

.

The list of phthora did not include one to indicate a change into the melos of phthora nana. This change was instead caused by one of the great signs, the xeron klasma, like here in the sticherarion of the Biblioteca ambrosiana, where the medial signature of phthora nana (a temporary change into its melos) is prepared by this great sign.

This sticheron could be sung as well by a protopsaltes in the soloistic kalophonic style. If the medial signature of nana was the end of the section chosen for the realisation of a sticheron kalophonikon, this sign could cause, that a whole kratema, a section in abstract syllables like  for instance, was created in the phthora nana as an echos kratema.

Nana as exoteric phthora atzem  

The phthora nana was called in various theories "phthora atzem" which referred to perde acem (the fret on the long necked lute tambur called "acem" which was a common reference for Ottoman musicians) or even to makam acem—the "Persian makam" or "phthora." Panagiotes Keltzanides' edition offered a seyir—a melodic example to illustrate makam acem—on page 81:

It is close to the melodic models of the Persian Dastgāh-e Šur.

The enharmonic echoi of the current Octoechos 

The reform of the Byzantine neume notation in the early 19th century redefined the mele according to each genre (troparic, heirmologic, sticheraric, papadic), it also transcribed for the first time the rhythm which was so far part of an oral tradition or method, how to do the thesis of the melos. In these transcriptions the diatonic tritos echoi had little relevance. Chrysanthos of Madytos, together with Chourmouzios the Archivist and Gregorios the Protopsaltes one of the three "great teachers" that undertook the reform, published a treatise explaining the principles of the new system, entitled "Theoretikon Mega tes Mousikes".

While there was once a diatonic form of echos tritos and echos varys, it has no longer any relevance for the current tradition of Orthodox chant, even if it based on Byzantine monodic chant. Orthodox chanters know nowadays only the intonation "nana", when they would like to perform melodies composed in echos tritos. Already Papadikai of the 16th century identified "nana" signature in their lists with the diatonic intonation "aneanes."

This simple form is used until today, but Chrysanthos also developed its whole melos as a kind of exegesis ("interpretation") of the simple traditional echema of phthora nana:

Chrysanthos' exegesis of the real nana intonation uses the enharmonic intervals:

.

Hence, if the melos of the enharmonic genus starts on F , F γα and b flat [−6] should be symphonous, and not the phthongos c νη'. And like the diatonic and chromatic scales are made of tetraphonia, here they are made of triphonia:
C νη—D πα—E sharp []—F , F —G —a —b flat [−6], b flat [−6]—c —d —e flat [−6].

He applied this intonation to the traditional varys enechema:

There is also a diatonic form of echos varys, but according to Chrysanthos' adaption to the Ottoman tone system it was no longer based on a pentachord between kyrios tritos and varys, but on a tritonus on a low b natural.

References

Theoretical sources

Hagiopolites 
.
.

Dialogue treatises 
.

Papadikai and their explanations 

.
.
.

.

Treatises of the New Method (since 19th century) 
.

Studies

External links 

Byzantine music theory
Modes (music)